Lesley Pratt Bannatyne is an American historian who writes extensively on Halloween, especially its history, literature, and contemporary celebration. She contributed the World Book Encyclopedia entry for Halloween and appears as a commentator on the annual October screening of “Haunted History of Halloween” on the History Channel. Bannatyne is also a freelance journalist who's covered stories ranging from druids in Somerville, Massachusetts to relief workers in Bolivia. She graduated Phi Beta Kappa from Wheaton College in Massachusetts with a degree in English. Her Master's is in Creative Writing and Literature from Harvard University Extension Studies. Her debut collection of short stories, Unaccustomed to Grace, was published by Kallisto Gaia Press in 2022.

Bannatyne's Halloween. An American Holiday, An American History was published in 1990 and, "ushered in a new era of scholarly interest in Halloween." Quoted as "A foremost authority on Halloween" by Charles F. Rosenay in his review of her latest book "Halloween Nation", Lesley has written five books on Halloween ranging from a children's book, Witches Night Before Halloween, to her latest  Halloween Nation which shows the holiday through the eyes of its celebrants. The book was nominated for a 2011 Bram Stoker Award.

Published works
 Unaccustomed to Grace. Stories (2022, Kallisto Gaia Press)
 Halloween Nation.  Behind the Scenes of America's Fright Night (2011, Pelican Publishing Company)
 Halloween. An American Holiday, An American History (1990, Facts on File; 1998 Pelican)
 A Halloween How To. Costumes, Parties, Decorations, and Destinations (2001, Pelican)
 A Halloween Reader. Stories, Poems, and Plays from Halloweens Past (2004, Pelican)
 Witches’ Night Before Halloween (for children) (2007, Pelican)

References

Sources
 Stories of Dark and Light, Boston Globe
 Pelican Publishing Company Author Bio
Lesley Bannatyne, Poets and Writers
 Lesley Bannatyne Journalism
  Bram Stoker Awards
  Guinness World Record
  Denver Post interview with Lesley Bannatyne by David Harsanyi
  Washington Post (Terry Sapienza) Halloween interview of Lesley Bannatyne
  Interview by Harvard Gazette
  "Monster Love" by Lesley Bannatyne, Pangyrus Literary Magazine
  "Halloween. A History" by Lesley Bannatyne

External links
 

Year of birth missing (living people)
Living people
American anthropology writers
Wheaton College (Massachusetts) alumni
Harvard Extension School alumni